Parvulus is a Latin adjective meaning small. It may refer to:

People
 Self-imposed nickname of Konrad Haenisch, 1876–1925, German politician

Species
 Acupalpus parvulus, a beetle species
 Anoplognathus parvulus, a beetle species
 Anthoscopus parvulus, a bird species
 Apenes parvulus, a beetle species
 Aphaenops parvulus, a beetle species
 Apteraliplus parvulus, a beetle species
 Archiargiolestes parvulus, a damselfly species
 Biphyllus parvulus, a beetle species
 Buckleria parvulus, a moth species
 Camarhynchus parvulus, a bird species
 Caprimulgus parvulus, a bird species
 Cataleptodius parvulus, a crab species
 Chinattus parvulus, a spider species
 Chrysotus parvulus, a fly species
 Cryptocephalus parvulus, a beetle species
 Derolathus parvulus, a beetle species
 Dicaelotus parvulus, an ichneumon wasp species
 Dromaeus parvulus, a synonym of Dromaius novaehollandiae ater a fossil bird
 Duncanius parvulus, a beetle species
 Elaphropus parvulus, a beetle species
 Eucamptognathus parvulus, a beetle species
 Eurohippus parvulus, an extinct species of the horse family
 Fusinus parvulus, a snail species
 Gymnopilus parvulus, a mushroom species
 Haplidus parvulus, a beetle species
 Hydrocanthus parvulus, a beetle species
 Joculator parvulus, a snail species
 Lactarius parvulus, a mushroom species
 Laemophloeus parvulus, a beetle species
 Lanthus parvulus, a dragonfly species
 Lathropus parvulus, a beetle species
 Limnephilus parvulus, a caddisfly species
 Luciogobius parvulus, a fish species
 Medionidus parvulus, a mussel species
 Metailurus parvulus, an extinct species of the cat family
 Metius parvulus, a beetle species
 Mimus parvulus, a bird species
 Mirosternus parvulus, a beetle species
 Nannastacus parvulus, a crustacean species
 Nesomimus parvulus, a bird species
 Nicrophorus parvulus, a synonym of Nicrophorus maculifrons, a beetle species
 Oopterus parvulus, a beetle species
 Orthotylus parvulus, a bug species
 Ostorhinchus parvulus, a fish species
 Oxybrycon parvulus, a frog species
 Papuadytes parvulus, a beetle species
 Parosphromenus parvulus, a fish species
 Pediobius parvulus, a wasp species
 Pediococcus parvulus, a bacterium species
 Philautus parvulus, a frog species
 Phrynobatrachus parvulus, a frog species
 Pinnotheres parvulus, a crab species
 Planctogystia parvulus, a moth species
 Portunus parvulus, a synonym of Liocarcinus pusillus, a crab species
 Proasellus parvulus, a crustacean species
 Pseudotaphoxenus parvulus, a beetle species
 Rhinosteus parvulus, a fossil fish species
 Rhizophagus parvulus, a beetle species
 Selenotichnus parvulus, a beetle species
 Somatogyrus parvulus, a snail species
 Sponsor parvulus, a beetle species
 Stolonis parvulus, a beetle species
 Stygiotrechus parvulus, a beetle species
 Styloxus parvulus, a beetle species
 Telephanus parvulus, a beetle species
 Toxidia parvulus, a butterfly species
 Zachaenus parvulus, a frog species

Subspecies
 Conus biliosus parvulus, a sea snail
 Hymenopappus filifolius subsp. parvulus, a plant in the daisy family
 Telmatobius brevirostris parvulus, a frog

See also
 Parvalux, manufacturer of electric motors